This is a list of Armenian football transfers in the winter transfer window, by club. Only clubs of the 2019–20 Armenian Premier League Armenian Premier League are included.

Armenian Premier League 2019-20

Alashkert

In:

Out:

Ararat-Armenia

In:

Out:

Ararat Yerevan

In:

Out:

Gandzasar Kapan

In:

Out:

Lori

In:

Out:

Noah

In:

Out:

Pyunik

In:

Out:

Shirak

In:

Out:

Urartu

In:

Out:

Yerevan

In:

Out:

References

Armenian
2019–20
2019–20 in Armenian football